The official languages of the Central African Republic are French and Sango. In total there are about 72 languages in the country.

In the CAR, French is the language of writing and formal situations. In 2022, French is spoken by 28.6 % of the population, i.e. 1.4 million people out of 5.

Sango has about 350,000 native speakers. It has become the lingua franca of the country. It became a national language in 1963 and an official language (alongside French) in 1991. It is estimated that 92% of the CAR's population is able to speak Sango. The language has become the mother tongue of almost all children in Bangui.

Nearly all of the native languages of the CAR belong to the Ubangian languages. There are a few Bantu languages in the extreme south, along the border with Congo-Brazzaville, and several Bongo–Bagirmi languages in the north, near the border with Chad. In addition, there is a Maban language, Runga. 

Education for the deaf in CAR uses American Sign Language, introduced by the deaf American missionary Andrew Foster.

See also 

Demographics of the Central African Republic
African French

References

External links 

 Linguistic situation in the Central African Republic
 Ethnologue listing of CAR languages